The Vanishing Rider is a 1928 American silent Western film serial directed by Ray Taylor and featuring William Desmond and Ethlyne Clair. Boris Karloff was also in the cast. The film is now considered to be lost.

Plot

Cast
 William Desmond as Jim Davis / The Vanishing Rider
 Ethlyne Clair as Mary Allen
 Nelson McDowell as Pop Smith
 Bud Osborne as Butch Bradley
 Boris Karloff as The Villain

See also
 List of film serials
 List of film serials by studio
 Boris Karloff filmography

References

External links
 

1928 films
1928 lost films
1928 Western (genre) films
American silent serial films
American black-and-white films
Lost Western (genre) films
Films directed by Ray Taylor
Lost American films
Universal Pictures film serials
Silent American Western (genre) films
Films with screenplays by George H. Plympton
1920s American films